Prince George–Omineca was a provincial electoral district for the Legislative Assembly of British Columbia, Canada from 1991 to 2009.

Demographics

Geography

History

Member of Legislative Assembly 
Its MLA before the redistribution was John Rustad, whose experience is in the forest industry. He was first elected in 2005 representing the British Columbia Liberal Party.

Election results

External links 
BC stats profile – 2001 (pdf)
Results of 2001 election (pdf)
2001 Expenditures
Results of 1996 election
1996 expenditures
Results of 1991 election
1991 expenditures
Website of the Legislative Assembly of British Columbia

Former provincial electoral districts of British Columbia
Politics of Prince George, British Columbia